Harry De Vere (February 1, 1870, New York City – October 10, 1923, Los Angeles) was an American silent film actor. He was signed by the Thanhouser Company based in New Rochelle, New York in 1914 and starred in about 70 films until his death in 1923, aged 53. He starred with William Garwood in films such as The Lost Sermon (1914).

Filmography

External links
 

1870 births
1923 deaths
American male film actors
American male silent film actors
Male actors from New York City
20th-century American male actors